Invencible (Spanish for "invincible") may refer to:

 Invencible (Deny album), 2014
 Invencible, a 2011 album by Daniela Castillo, or the title song
 El Patrón: Invencible, or Invencible, a 2011 album by Tito El Bambino
 "Invencible", a song by Libído  from Pop*Porn